Braden J. Stewart (born 20 September 1996) is a New Zealand rugby union player who plays for  in the Bunnings NPC.  His position is Flanker.

Career 

References

External links
itsrugby.co.uk profile

New Zealand rugby union players
1996 births
Living people
People educated at Marlborough Boys' College
Rugby union flankers
Tasman rugby union players